The 2004 Oregon State Beavers football team represented Oregon State University in the 2004 NCAA Division I-A football season. Led by head coach Mike Riley, the Beavers won the 2004 Insight Bowl.

Schedule

Roster
QB Derek Anderson, Sr.

Game summaries

LSU

Insight Bowl

References

Oregon State
Oregon State Beavers football seasons
Guaranteed Rate Bowl champion seasons
Oregon State Beavers football